William G. Waite (October 1917, in Massachusetts – 1980) was an American-born musicologist.

Waite was educated and taught solely at Yale. He began his teaching career in 1947 and received his PhD in 1951. His dissertation, The Rhythm of Twelfth-Century Polyphony: its Theory and Practice outlines his ideas on modal interpretation of organum duplum. The second half of this work is a transcription of organum from the Magnus liber organi.   His textbook, The Art of Music (1962), written with Beekman Cannon and Alvin Johnson, was a popular introductory music text for many years.  He died from pancreatic cancer in 1980.

1917 births
1980 deaths
Yale University alumni
Yale University faculty
20th-century American musicologists